is a Japanese manga series written and illustrated by Kimiko Uehara. The story follows the life of Kyoko, an obstetrician and gynecologist practicing in a small town in Nagano, Japan.  has been serialized in Akita Shoten's  manga magazine For Mrs. since 1991 and collected in 85  volumes as of July 2021. It was adapted into a live-action Japanese television drama series that aired for 59 episodes on Fuji TV in 1998.

Plot

Characters
 
 Portrayed by: Azusa Watanabe
 
 Portrayed by:

Reception
In 2004,  was one of the titles recommended by the jury of the manga division at the 8th Japan Media Arts Festival.

References

Further reading

External links
  
 Neonime.is

1991 manga
1998 Japanese television series debuts
1998 Japanese television series endings
Akita Shoten manga
Fuji TV original programming
Japanese television dramas based on manga
Josei manga
Medical anime and manga